Clubul Sportiv Sporting Liești, commonly known as Sporting Liești, is a Romanian football club based in Liești, Galați County, Romania. Currently the team plays in Liga III.

History
Clubul Sportiv Sporting Liești was founded in 2012 and after only one season they promoted to Liga III after a play-off match against FC Gârceni, Vaslui County champions, match won 5–3 by the team from Liești.

In the first 4 seasons of Liga III best finish was 6th place at the end of the 2016–17 Liga III season.

Ground
The club plays its home matches on Comunal Stadium in Liești, Galați County and has a capacity of 2,500 people on standing terrace.

Honours

Leagues
Liga IV – Galați County
Winners (2): 2011–12, 2012–13

Cups
Cupa României – Galați County
Winners (1): 2012–13

Other performances 
 6 seasons in Liga III

Players

First-team squad

Out on loan

Club officials

Board of directors

Current technical staff

League history

References

External links

Association football clubs established in 2013
Football clubs in Galați County
Liga III clubs
Liga IV clubs
2013 establishments in Romania